C. C. Tan may refer to:
Tan Jiazhen, a Chinese geneticist
Tan Chye Cheng, a Singaporean politician